Kestrosaurus, occasionally misspelt as Kerstisaurus, is an extinct genus of Triassic capitosauroid temnospondyl amphibian within the family Mastodonsauridae.

See also

 Prehistoric amphibian
 List of prehistoric amphibians

References 

Triassic temnospondyls of Africa
Fossil taxa described in 1925